Giuseppe Prinzi (1825–1895) was an Italian sculptor.

Biography 
He began his studies in Messina with Letterio Subba and Thomas Aloisio Juvarra and continued his training at Academy of San Luca in Rome with Pietro Tenerani. He made numerous sculptures, which are located in various cities in Italy, among them, Rome, Naples and Messina, his hometown.

Works (selection) 
 Messina: Female statue with allegory of  Messina  (1852)
 Campobasso Statue of Flora (1873)
 St. Peter's Basilica (Vatican City): Statue of  St. William of Vercelli  (1878)
 Pincio (Rome): Bust astronomer Angelo Secchi (1879)
 Basilica di San Benedetto (Norcia) Statue of Saint Benedict (1880)
 Castle Pennisi Floristella (Acireale): Relief burial (1886)
 Cathedral of Saint John (Ragusa): Relief
 Teatro Vittorio Emanuele II (Messina): Bust of Ferdinand II
 Regional Museum of Messina: Bust of Antonello da Messina

References

Further reading
 Includes some biographical information

1825 births
1895 deaths
19th-century Italian sculptors
Italian male sculptors
19th-century Italian male artists